The Swing, also known as The Happy Accidents of the Swing (the original title), is an 18th-century oil painting by Jean-Honoré Fragonard in the Wallace Collection in London. It is considered to be one of the masterpieces of the Rococo era, and is Fragonard's best-known work.

Description
The painting depicts an elegantly dressed young woman on a swing. A smiling young man, hiding in the bushes below and to the left, points towards her billowing dress with hat in hand. A smiling older man, who is nearly hidden in the shadows on the right, propels the swing with a pair of ropes, as a small white dog barks nearby. The lady is wearing a bergère hat (shepherdess hat), as she flings her shoe with an outstretched left foot. Two statues are present, one of a putto, who watches from above the young man on the left with its finger in front of its lips, the other of two putti is on the right beside the older man.

According to the memoirs of the dramatist Charles Collé, a courtier (homme de la cour) first asked Gabriel François Doyen to make this painting of him and his mistress. Not comfortable with this frivolous work, Doyen refused and passed on the commission to Fragonard.  The man had requested a portrait of his mistress seated on a swing being pushed by a bishop, but Fragonard painted a layman.

This style of "frivolous" painting soon became the target of the philosophers of the Enlightenment, who demanded a more serious art which would show the nobility of man.

Provenance

The original ownership is uncertain. A firm provenance begins only with the tax farmer Marie-François Ménage de Pressigny, who was guillotined in 1794, after which it was seized by the revolutionary government. It was possibly later owned by the marquis des Razins de Saint-Marc, and certainly by the duc de Morny. After his death in 1865, it was bought at auction in Paris by Lord Hertford, the main founder of the Wallace Collection.

Notable copies
There are two notable copies, neither by Fragonard. 
 One copy, once owned by Edmond James de Rothschild, portrays the woman in a blue dress.
 The other is a smaller version (56 × 46 cm), owned by Duke Jules de Polignac. This painting became the property of the Grimaldi family in 1930 when Pierre de Polignac (1895-1964) married Princess Charlotte, Duchess of Valentinois (1898-1977). In 1966, the Grimaldi & Labeyrie Collection gave it to the city of Versailles, where it is currently exhibited at the Musée Lambinet, attributed to Fragonard's workshop.

Notable derived works
 1782: Les Hazards Heureux de l'Escarpolettes, etching and engraving by :fr:Nicolas de Launay (1739–1792), 62.3 × 45.5 cm (24 ⅝ × 17 ⅞ in). Contrary to the original painting, the lady is facing right and has plumes on her hat (among other dissimilarities) because it was drawn after the replica owned by Edmond de Rothschild.
 1920: The poem "Portrait of a Lady" by William Carlos Williams is believed to reference Fragonard's work and this painting in particular. 
 1972: The Little Feat album Sailin' Shoes features front cover artwork by Neon Park that alludes to Fragonard's work.
 1999: The first act of the ballet Contact: The Musical by Susan Stroman and John Weidman is described as a "contact improvisation" on the painting.<ref
 name="contact">

</ref>
 2001: The Swing (after Fragonard) is a headless lifesize recreation of Fragonard's model clothed in African fabric, by Yinka Shonibare
2013: The animated Disney film Frozen displays a version of The Swing in a scene when lead character Anna dances through an art gallery singing "For the First Time in Forever."
2022: The promotional poster for season three of the HBO Max show Harley Quinn uses a version of The Swing with Harley Quinn and Ivy on the swing while other characters from the show can be seen in the background.

Notes

References
Ingamells, John, The Wallace Collection, Catalogue of Pictures, Vol III, French before 1815, Wallace Collection, 1989,

External links

 The painting at the Wallace Collection website
 The Swing - Analysis and Critical Reception

1767 paintings
Erotic art
Rococo paintings
Paintings by Jean-Honoré Fragonard
Paintings in the Wallace Collection
Paintings of Cupid